Giovanni Villamarino (died 1525) was a Roman Catholic prelate who served as Bishop of Mazara del Vallo (1503–1525).

Biography
In 1503, Giovanni Villamarino was appointed by Pope Alexander VI as Bishop of Mazara del Vallo. He served as Bishop of Mazara del Vallo until his death in 1525.

References

External links and additional sources
 (for Chronology of Bishops) 
 (for Chronology of Bishops) 

16th-century Italian Roman Catholic bishops
1525 deaths
Bishops appointed by Pope Alexander VI